Posani Naga Sudheer Babu (born 11 May 1977) is an Indian actor and former professional badminton player. He works primarily in Telugu films. Debuted as a lead actor in Shiva Manasulo Shruti (2012), Babu's successful films include Prema Katha Chitram (2013), Baaghi (2016), and Sammohanam (2018). He won SIIMA Special Jury award for his performance in Sammohanam.

Film career
Babu began his acting career with a supporting role in Gautham Vasudev Menon-directed Ye Maaya Chesave (2010), produced by his sister-in-law Manjula Ghattamaneni. His first film in a leading role was the Siva Manasulo Sruthi (2012). a remake of Tamil film Siva Manasula Sakthi (2009).

Babu tasted success with the 2013 horror comedy film, Prema Katha Chitram. Made on a budget of 2 crore, the film went onto gross 20 crore at the box office. In the same year, he appeared in Aadu Magaadra Bujji. In 2015, Babu played the lead role in three films, Krishnamma Kalipindi Iddarini, Mosagallaku Mosagadu, and Bhale Manchi Roju.

In 2016, Babu made his Hindi film debut with Baaghi, where he played an antagonistic role. His 2017 film Samanthakamani was a commercial success.

In 2018, Babu teamed up with director Mohana Krishna Indraganti for the romantic drama film Sammohanam. The film where a young cartoonist falls for an actress turned out to be a profitable venture. In the same year, he appeared in two other films, namely  Nannu Dochukunduvate and Veera Bhoga Vasantha Rayalu.

In his second collaboration with Indraganti, Babu appeared in action thriller V (2020) alongside actor Nani.

Badminton career
Prior to entering the film industry, Babu was the Number 1 ranked badminton player of Andhra Pradesh as well as Karnataka. He has played alongside Pullela Gopichand as a doubles partner. He is scheduled to play the role of Gopichand in the latter's biopic.

Personal life 
Sudheer Babu is married to Priyadarshini, daughter of actor Krishna and younger sister of Mahesh Babu. The couple has two children.

Filmography

Awards and nominations

References

External links

Living people
Telugu male actors
Male actors in Telugu cinema
1979 births
Racket sportspeople from Vijayawada
21st-century Indian male actors
South Indian International Movie Awards winners
Zee Cine Awards Telugu winners
Male actors from Vijayawada
People from Vijayawada